Chang'e 5 was the fifth lunar exploration mission of the Chinese Lunar Exploration Program, and China's first lunar sample-return mission. Like its predecessors, the spacecraft is named after the Chinese moon goddess, Chang'e. It launched at 20:30 UTC on 23 November 2020, from Wenchang Spacecraft Launch Site on Hainan Island, landed on the Moon on 1 December 2020, collected ~ of lunar samples (including from a core ~1 m deep), and returned to the Earth at 17:59 UTC on 16 December 2020.

Chang'e-5 was the first lunar sample-return mission since the Soviet Union's Luna 24 in 1976. The mission made China the third country to return samples from the Moon after the United States and the Soviet Union.

Overview 
The Chinese Lunar Exploration Program has four phases, with incremental technological advancement:

 Phase one: orbiting the Moon, completed by Chang'e 1 in 2007 and Chang'e 2 in 2010.
 Phase two: soft landing and deploying rover on the Moon, completed by Chang'e 3 (2013)  and Chang'e 4 (launched in December 2018, landed on the far side of the Moon in January 2019).
 Phase three: returning lunar samples, completed by Chang'e 5. The backup of Chang'e-5, the Chang'e 6 mission, is also a lunar sample-return mission.
 Phase four: in-situ resource utilization, and constructing an International Lunar Research Station near the lunar south pole.

The Chinese Lunar Exploration Program will finally lead to crewed missions in the 2030s.

Equipment

Components 
The Chang'e-5 mission consists of four modules or components:
 Lander: landed on the lunar surface after separating from the Orbiter, installed with a drill and a scooping device. The Ascender is on the top of the Lander.
 Ascender: after sampling, the lunar samples were transported to a container within the Ascender. The Ascender launched from the lunar surface at 15:11 UTC, on 3 December 2020, followed by automatic lunar orbit rendezvous and docking with the Orbiter. After transferring the sample, the Ascender separated from the Orbiter, deorbited, and fell back down on the Moon at 22:49 UTC, on 6 December 2020, to avoid becoming space debris.
 Orbiter: after the samples were transported from the Ascender to the Orbiter, the Orbiter left lunar orbit and spent ~4.5 days flying back to Earth orbit and released the Returner (reentry capsule) just before arrival.
 Returner: The Returner performed a skip reentry to bounce off the atmosphere once before formal reentering.

The four components were launched together and flew to the Moon as a combined unit. After reaching lunar orbit (14:58 UTC, on 28 November 2020), the Lander/Ascender separated from the Orbiter/Returner modules (20:40 UTC, on 29 November 2020), and descended to the surface of the Moon (15:13 UTC, on 1 December 2020). After samples had been collected, the Ascender separated from the Lander (15:11 UTC, on 3 December 2020), lifted off to the Orbiter/Returner, docked with them, and transferred the samples to the Returner. The Ascender then separated from the Orbiter/Returner and crashed on the Moon (~30°S in latitude and 0° in longitude) at 22:49 UTC, on 8 December 2020. The Orbiter/Returner then returned to the Earth, where the Returner separated and descended to the surface of the Earth at 17:59 UTC, on 16 December 2020.

Unlike Chang'e 4, which was equipped with a radioisotope heater unit to survive the extreme cold of lunar night, the Lander of Chang'e-5 stopped functioning in the following lunar night.

Scientific payloads 
Chang'e-5 included four scientific payloads, including a Landing Camera, a Panoramic Camera, a Lunar Mineralogical Spectrometer, and a Lunar Regolith Penetrating Radar. Chang'e-5 collected samples using two methods, i.e., drilling for subsurface samples and scooping for surface samples. The scooping device was developed by The Hong Kong Polytechnic University, consisting of Sampler A, Sampler B, Near-field Cameras, and Sealing and Packaging System.

Mission profile

Launch 
Chang'e 5 was planned to be launched in November 2017 by the Long March 5 rocket. However, a July 2017 failure of the referenced carrier rocket forced a delay on the original schedule two times until the end of 2020. On 27 December 2019, the Long March 5 successfully returned to service, thereby allowing the current mission to proceed after the Tianwen-1 mission. The Chang'e 5 probe was launched at 20:30 UTC, on 23 November 2020, by a Long March 5 Y-5 launch vehicle from the Wenchang Spacecraft Launch Site on Hainan Island.

Earth-Moon Transfer 

After launch, Chang'e-5 applied its first orbital correction at 14:06 UTC, on 24 November 2020, second orbital correction at 14:06 UTC, on 25 November 2020, entered lunar orbit at 14:58 UTC, on 28 November 2020 (elliptical orbital), adjusted its orbit to a circular orbit at 12:23 UTC, on 29 November 2020, and the Lander/Ascender separated from the Orbiter/Returner at 20:10 UTC, on 29 November 2020, in preparation for landing.

Landing site 

The Lander/Ascender landed on the Moon on 1 December 2020, at 15:11 UTC. The Chang'e 5 landing site is at 43.1°N (in latitude), 51.8°W (in longitude) in the Northern Oceanus Procellarum near a huge volcanic complex, Mons Rümker, located in the northwest lunar near side.  The area is mapped as 'Eratosthenian Mare' by the USGS. The Chang'e 5 landing site, named Statio Tianchuan, is within the Procellarum KREEP Terrain, with elevated heat-producing elements, thin crust, and prolonged volcanism. This area is characterized by some of the youngest mare basalts on the Moon (~1.21 billion years old), with elevated titanium, thorium, and olivine abundances, which have never been sampled by the Apollo or Luna missions.

Back to the Earth 

The Chang'e 5 Ascender lifted off from Oceanus Procellarum at 15:10 UTC, on 3 December 2020, and six minutes later, arrived in lunar orbit. The Ascender docked with the Orbiter/Returner combination in lunar orbit on 5 December 2020, at 21:42 UTC, and the samples were transferred to the return capsule at 22:12 UTC. The Ascender separated from the Orbiter/Returner combination on 6 December 2020, at 04:35 UTC. After completing its role of the mission, the Ascender was commanded to deorbit on 7 December 2020, at 22:59 UTC, and crashed into the Moon's surface at 23:30 UTC, in the area of (~30°S, 0°E). On 13 December 2020, at 01:51 UTC, from a distance of 230 kilometers from the lunar surface, the Orbiter and Returner successfully fired four engines to enter the Moon-Earth Hohmann transfer orbit.

The electronics and systems on the Chang'e 5 lunar lander were expected to cease working on 11 December 2020, due to the Moon's extreme cold and lack of a radioisotope heater unit. However, engineers were also prepared for the possibility that the Chang'e 5 lander could be damaged and stop working after acting as the launchpad for the ascender module on 3 December 2020, as turned out to be the case.

On 16 December 2020, at around 18:00 UTC, the roughly  return capsule performed a ballistic skip reentry, in effect bouncing off the atmosphere over the Arabian Sea before re-entry. Surveillance drones spotted the Returner capsule prior to its touchdown, and recovery vehicles located the capsule shortly afterwards.

The next day, it was reported that Chang'e 5's service module had performed an atmospheric re-entry avoidance burn and had been on-course to an Earth-Sun L1 Lagrange point orbit as a part of its extended mission.

Extended mission 
After dropping off the return samples for Earth, the Chang'e 5 (CE-5) orbiter was successfully captured by the Sun-Earth L1 Lagrange point at 5:39 UTC, on 15 March 2021, and became the first Chinese spacecraft to orbit the Sun-Earth L1 Lagrange point. The distance at the time of capture was about 936,700 kilometers from Earth and the orbiter entered an orbit with a period of about 6 months. On its 88-day journey to L1, mission control conducted 2 orbital maneuvers and 2 trajectory correction maneuvers. It made a lunar flyby in an extended mission on 9 September 2021.

In January 2022, CE-5 left the L1 point for the lunar distant retrograde orbit (DRO) to conduct very-long-baseline interferometry tests in preparation for the next stage of China's Lunar Exploration Program. According to The Space Review (TSR), this maneuver was depicted in Chinese government and academic documents. In February 2022, Multiple amateur satellite trackers observed that CE-5 had entered DRO, which was the first spacecraft in history to utilize the orbit.

Lunar sample research 

The ~ of lunar samples collected by Chang'e-5 have enormous scientific meanings in terms of their abnormally young ages (<2.0 billion years old). At least 27 fundamental questions can be answered by those samples on lunar chronology, petrogenesis, regional setting, geodynamic and thermal evolution, and regolith formation, especially, calibrating the lunar chronology function, constraining the lunar dynamo status, unraveling the deep mantle properties, and assessing the Procellarum KREEP Terrain structures.

Dating this relatively young part of the Moon's surface would provide an additional calibration point for estimating the surface ages of other Solar System bodies. Wu Yanhua, deputy director of the China National Space Administration (CNSA) announced that the new samples will be shared with the UN and international partners for space research purposes.

Preliminary analysis of the basalt lava samples taken from Oceanus Procellarum, led by the Chinese Academy of Geological Sciences, determined the age of these rocks to be close to 1.96 billion years old, filling a critical age-gap of available lunar rock samples, which, among other applications, can assist in further calibrating planetary crater chronological tools. The team discovered evidence of hydroxyl molecules in the samples through reflectance spectra, indicating the likely presence of water molecules up to 120 ppm. The researchers postulated the water and hydroxyl molecules had been embedded in the lunar soil through solar wind.

First Chinese flag on the Moon 
Chang'e 5's lunar lander deployed the first Chinese flag on the moon. The flag was made from a composite material to withstand the moon's harsh environment without fading or deforming. Chinese scientists spent over a year testing dozens of possible materials for the flag. Weighing only 12 grams, it can maintain its true colors under a temperature difference of plus or minus 150 degrees Celsius.

Related missions

Chang'e 5-T1 

Chang'e 5-T1 is an experimental robotic lunar mission that was launched on 23 October 2014, to conduct atmospheric re-entry tests on the capsule design that was planned to be used in the Chang'e 5 mission. Its service module, called DFH-3A, remained in orbit around the Earth before being relocated via Earth–Moon L2 to lunar orbit by 13 January 2015, where it is using its remaining 800 kg of fuel to test maneuvers critical to future lunar missions.

International collaboration 

The European Space Agency (ESA) had supported the Chang'e 5 mission by providing tracking via ESA's Kourou station, located in French Guiana. ESA tracked the spacecraft during the launch and landing phases while providing on-call backup for China's ground stations throughout the mission. Data from the Kourou station had helped the mission control team at the Beijing Aerospace Flight Control Center to determine the spacecraft's health and orbit status. Chang'e 5 was returned to Earth on 16 December 2020. During the landing phase, ESA used its Maspalomas Station, located in the Canary Islands and operated by the Instituto Nacional de Técnica Aeroespacial (INTA) in Spain, to support the tracking efforts.

International reactions 
Science journalist Bob McDonald discussed Chang'e 5 in comparison to the Soviet Luna programme, which involved Luna 15, Luna 16, and Luna 24 being sent to the Moon. Luna 15 attempted to grab a sample of lunar soil and return it to Earth before the American Apollo 11 astronauts Neil Armstrong, Buzz Aldrin, and Michael Collins got back in July 1969. It crashed during its landing attempt, hence losing the opportunity for a "propaganda coup". The Luna 16 mission successfully returned about 100 grams of lunar soil a year later and two other sample return missions succeeded in subsequent years, the most recent being Luna 24 in 1976. McDonald considers that China just entered another Moon race, except this time, the robots might be in the lead.

Bradley Perrett, Asia-Pacific Bureau Chief of Aviation Week Network, opined that the Moon race between the Soviet Union and the United States in the 1960s was driven by propaganda: a message to the world about their strength. Perrett noted that the Chang'e project was also driven by propaganda utility, but primarily for the internal audience; the reason that the Chinese government funded this mission was to show the Chinese people that "China can do it".

See also 
 Chinese space program
 Chinese Lunar Exploration Program (CLEP) 
 Exploration of the Moon
 List of missions to the Moon
 List of artificial objects on the Moon
 Lunar resources
 Moon landing

Notes

References

External links 
 
 China’s first Moon rocks ignite research bonanza at Nature

Chinese Lunar Exploration Program
Missions to the Moon
Sample return missions
Chinese space probes
Space probes launched in 2020
2020 in China
2020 on the Moon
Spacecraft launched by Long March rockets
Spacecraft which reentered in 2020